Ernst Brandi (13 July 1875 – 22 October 1937) was a German mining engineer, industrial manager and chairman of the Ruhrbergbau. He participated in the Secret Meeting of 20 February 1933 between Hitler and 20 to 25 industrialists aimed at financing the election campaign of the Nazi Party.

References

Citations

Bibliography

External links
 

1875 births
1937 deaths
Scientists from Osnabrück
German mining businesspeople
German People's Party politicians